Vineburg is an unincorporated community in Sonoma County, California, United States. Vineburg has a post office which was established in 1897.

References

External links

Unincorporated communities in California
Unincorporated communities in Sonoma County, California